Stefan Kozlov was the defending champion but lost in the first round to Kamil Majchrzak.

Thanasi Kokkinakis won the title after defeating Blaž Rola 6–4, 6–4 in the final.

Seeds

Draw

Finals

Top half

Bottom half

References

External links
Main draw
Qualifying draw

Las Vegas Challenger - Singles
Las Vegas Challenger